"Heartbeat" is a song by Richard Orlinski and Eva Simons released in 2016.

Chart performance

Weekly charts

References

2016 songs
2016 singles
SNEP Top Singles number-one singles
Eva Simons songs
Songs written by Eva Simons